The 2004 CSIO Gijón was the 2004 edition of the Spanish official show jumping horse show, at Las Mestas Sports Complex in Gijón. It was held as CSIO 5*.

This edition of the CSIO Gijón was held between 27 August to 4 September.

Nations Cup
The competition was a show jumping competition with two rounds. The height of the fences were up to 1.60 meters. The best six teams of the eleven which participated were allowed to start in the second round.

The competition was endowed with €60,000.

In bold, riders that contested the jump-off.

Grey penalties points do not count for the team result.

Gijón Grand Prix
The Gijón Grand Prix, the Show jumping Grand Prix of the 2004 CSIO Gijón, was the major show jumping competition at this event. It was held on 2 August 2004. The competition was a show jumping competition over one round with tie-break for the riders that made 0 points in the main round, the height of the fences were up to 1.60 meters.

It was endowed with 91,500 €.

(Top 10 of 48 Competitors)

References

External links
Special website for the event at El Comercio
Official website

CSIO Gijón
2004 in show jumping